Devil Between the Legs is a 2019 Mexican romantic drama film directed by Arturo Ripstein and starring Sylvia Pasquel.

Plot 
This black and white film brings up the topic of sex and passion at an older age. The couple portrayed has a love/hate relationship, an ambivalence that is reflected in their sexual relation where the man adopts an abusive stance towards the woman. A third character, the maid, fuels a triptic dynamic in this natural perversion.

Cast
Sylvia Pasquel as Beatriz
Alejandro Suárez as The Old Man
Greta Cervantes as Dinorah
Daniel Giménez Cacho

References

External links
 

2019 romantic drama films
Mexican romantic drama films
Films directed by Arturo Ripstein
Films scored by David Mansfield
2010s Mexican films